Free public transport, often called fare-free public transit or zero-fare public transport, refers to public transport funded in full by means other than by collecting fares from passengers. It may be funded by national, regional or local government through taxation, or by commercial sponsorship by businesses.  Alternatively, the concept of "free-ness" may take other forms, such as no-fare access via a card which may or may not be paid for in its entirety by the user.

On 29 February 2020, Luxembourg became the first country in the world to make all public transport in the country (buses, trams, and trains) free to use. On 1 October 2022, Malta became the second country in the world to make its public transport system free for all residents. Germany is considering making their public transit system fare-free in response to the EU's threatening to fine them for their air pollution levels.

As some transit lines intended to operate with fares initially start service, they may elect to not collect fares for an introductory period to create interest or test operations.

Types

City-wide systems
Tallinn, capital city of Estonia with more than 420,000 inhabitants, as well as several mid-size European cities and many smaller towns around the world have converted their public transportation networks to zero-fare. The city of Hasselt in Belgium is a notable example: fares were abolished in 1997 and ridership was as much as "13 times higher" by 2006.

See list below.

Local services

Local zero-fare shuttles or inner-city loops are far more common than citywide systems. They often use buses or trams. These may be set up by a city government to ease bottlenecks or fill short gaps in the transport network.

 See List of free public transport routes for a list of zero-fare routes within wider (fare-paying) networks

Zero-fare transport is often operated as part of the services offered within a public facility, such as a hospital or university campus shuttle or an airport inter-terminal shuttle.

Some zero-fare services may be built to avoid the need for large transport construction. Port cities where shipping would require very high bridges might provide zero-fare ferries instead. These are free at the point of use, just as the use of a bridge might have been.
Machinery installed within a building or shopping centre can be seen as 'zero-fare transport': elevators, escalators and moving sidewalks are often provided by property owners and funded through the sales of goods and services. Community bicycle programs, providing free bicycles for short-term public use could be thought of as zero-fare transport.

A common example of zero-fare transport is student transport, where students travelling to or from school do not need to pay. A notable example is the University of Wisconsin-Stevens Point, which provides much of the funding to operate the Stevens Point Transit system. All students at the university can use any of the four citywide campus routes and the other four bus routes throughout the city free of charge. The university also funds two late night bus routes to serve the downtown free of charge with a goal of cutting down drunk driving.

In some regions transport is free because the revenues are lower that expenses from fare collection is already partially paid by government or company or service (for example BMO railway road in Moscow, most part of is used to as service transport and officially pick up passengers).

Many large amusement parks will have trams servicing large parking lots or distant areas. Disneyland in Anaheim, California, runs a tram from its entrance, across the parking lot, and across the street to its hotel as well as the bus stop for Orange County and Los Angeles local transit buses. Six Flags Magic Mountain in Valencia, California, provides tram service throughout its parking lot.

In July 2017, Dubai announced it would offer free bus services for a short period of time on selected days.

Emergency relief
During natural disasters, pandemics, and other area-wide emergencies, some transit agencies offer zero-fare transport.

Sonoma–Marin Area Rail Transit commuter rail temporarily offered free service for those needing transportation alternatives during the 2017 Tubbs Fire and 2019 Kincade Fire.

Some agencies, including the Central Ohio Transit Authority and King County Metro, offer free public transport during snow emergencies to reduce the number of vehicles on the street.

COVID-19 pandemic 

During the COVID-19 pandemic, several agencies paused the collection of fares to alleviate concerns that the virus could be transmitted on surfaces, to keep travelers from coming into close contact with employees, or to allow rear door boarding on their vehicles. These agencies are mostly located in smaller cities where the farebox recovery ratio is low as they could afford to implement this policy without a major hit to revenue.

Benefits

Operational benefits
Transport operators can benefit from faster boarding and shorter dwell times, allowing faster timetabling of services. Although some of these benefits can be achieved in other ways, such as off-vehicle ticket sales and modern types of electronic fare collection, zero-fare transport avoids equipment and personnel costs.

Passenger aggression may be reduced. In 2008 bus drivers of Société des Transports Automobiles (STA) in Essonne held strikes demanding zero-fare transport for this reason. They claim that 90% of the aggression is related to refusal to pay the fare.

Commercial benefits
Some zero-fare transport services are funded by private businesses, such as the merchants in a shopping mall, in the hope that doing so will increase sales or other revenue from increased foot traffic or ease of travel. Employers often operate free shuttles as a benefit to their employees, or as part of a congestion mitigation agreement with a local government.

Community benefits
Zero-fare transport can make the system more accessible and fair for low-income residents. Other benefits are the same as those attributed to public transport generally:
 Road traffic can benefit from decreased congestion and faster average road speeds, fewer traffic accidents, easier parking, savings from reduced wear and tear on roads
 Increased public access, especially for the poor and low waged, which can in turn benefit social integration, businesses and those looking for work
Environmental and public health benefits including decreased air pollution and noise pollution from road traffic

Global benefits
Global benefits of zero-fare transport are also the same as those attributed to public transport generally. If use of personal cars is discouraged, zero-fare public transport could mitigate the problems of global warming and oil depletion.

Drawbacks

Several large U.S. municipalities have attempted zero-fare systems, but many of these implementations have been judged unsuccessful by policy makers. A 2002 National Center for Transportation Research report suggests that, while transit ridership does tend to increase, there are also some disadvantages:
 An increase in vandalism, resulting in increased costs for security and vehicle-maintenance   
 In large transit systems, significant revenue shortfalls unless additional funding was provided
 An increase in driver complaints and staff turnover, although farebox-related arguments were eliminated
 Slower service overall (not collecting fares has the effect of speeding boarding, but increased crowding tends to swamp out this effect unless additional vehicles are added)
 Declines in schedule adherence

This U.S. report suggests that, while ridership does increase overall, the goal of enticing drivers to take transit instead of driving is not necessarily met: because fare-free systems tend to attract a certain number of "problem riders", zero-fare systems may have the unintended effect of convincing some 'premium' riders to go back to driving their cars. It should be kept in mind that this was a study that only looked at U.S. cities, and the author's conclusions may be less applicable in other countries that have better social safety nets and less crime than the large U.S. cities studied.

Countries with area-wide zero-fare transport 
Luxembourg was the first country to offer free public transport (trams, trains, and buses). Since 1 March 2020, all second-class public transport has been free in the Duchy.

Estonia has the ambition to become entirely zero-fare. Counties are allowed to make public transport free. As of May 2019, buses are free of charge in 11 of Estonia's 15 counties. Public transport in Estonia's capital, Tallinn, is free to local residents since 2013.

Scotland has implemented free bus travel for people across the country under 22-years-old since 31 January 2022.

Romania has also introduced free public transportation including bus, subway and inter-country trains for all pre-university students. University students only have the option for a 50% discount on individual inter-country train tickets or inter-city subscriptions.

List of towns and cities with area-wide zero-fare transport

Europe

Asia

Americas

Brazil

Canada

United States

Perception and analysis
Fare free transit has repeatedly demonstrated to increase ridership — especially during non-peak travel periods — and customer satisfaction. Several analyses have shown increased ridership by as much as 15% overall and about 45% during the off-peak periods. The effects on public transport operators included schedule adherence problems because of the increased ridership and more complaints about rowdiness from younger passengers, though obviously there were no more direct conflicts with passengers regarding fare collection. When the University of California, Los Angeles covered fare for the university community, ridership increased by 56% in the first year and solo driving fell by 20% (though one older study showed no measurable impact on automobile use).

In the United States, mass transit systems that collect fares are only expected to generate about 10% of the annual revenue themselves, with the remainder covered by either public or private investment and advertisements. Therefore, politicians and social-justice advocacy groups, such as the Swedish network Planka.nu, see zero-fare public transport as a low-cost, high-impact approach to reducing economic inequality. It has also been argued that transportation to and from work is essential to the employer in the managing of work hours, so financing of public transportation should fall to employers rather than private individuals or public funds.

See also
 Car-free movement
 Effects of the car on societies
 Movimento Passe Livre, Brazilian movement campaigning for free public transport
 Planka.nu Swedish membership network which pays the penalty fare if you get caught without paying ticket
 Reduced fare programs
 Transport divide
 Universal basic services
 Universal transit pass
 Urban vitality
 9-Euro-Ticket (in Germany in June, July and August 2022)

References

External links
freepublictransports.com Network of groups promoting free public transport
freepublictransit.org Advocacy website
en.wordpress.com/tag/free-public-transport/ World Streets summer 2010 series on Free Public Transport
Argument against free public transport
Luxembourg to trial free public transport to tackle congestion. Sky News report on YouTube. Published/uploaded on 23 December 2019.

Transport economics